Totzeret HaAretz Towers (Migdalei Totzeret HaAretz), stylized as ToHa, is a partly built complex of three office skyscrapers in Tel Aviv, Israel. The first tower was completed in February 2019, and the second is slated to be inaugurated in 2024.

History
The complex is located on and named after Totzeret Haaretz Street in Nahalat Yitzhak, in eastern Tel Aviv. It faces HaShalom Street in the south and Yigal Allon Street in the west. It is within walking distance of Tel Aviv HaShalom railway station.

The towers were designed by the British-Israeli architect Ron Arad and Yashar Architects, while the public space design was given to UK-based Vogt Landscape Architects, and the local company Tema. The developing company is a partnership between Amot and Gav-Yam.

One lot was purchased from the Tara Compound to the west, and the other from Gazit-Globe, which saw the demolition of the latter's office building there. The complex is meant to adhere to the LEED Platinum standard.

WeWork is the largest tenant in the first tower, having leased 6.5 floors through Israeli real estate company Ampa. This is WeWork's largest space in Israel.

In 2018, Akamai Technologies rented two floors in the first tower. Other tenants include Natural Intelligence, Tufin, Dynamic Yield, Discount Investments and Trax Retail. In November 2018, Amot reported that 95% of the office space in the tower had been leased.

Buildings
The Totzeret Haaretz complex consists of three towers.

Totzeret HaAretz 1
It contains  of office space, and cost ILS 950 million to build. Architect Asa Bruno from Ron Arad's office oversaw the tower's construction.

According to the architects, the tower is meant to resemble an iceberg. The tower stands on three legs of seven floors each, containing the technical infrastructure of the building. The legs are also meant to house a restaurant and café, and part of the roof is reserved for a restaurant. There is atrium in the middle of the tower, spanning the floors above the legs. The building features double glass panels, with centrally-controlled curtains in between. Between the floors there are Dekton-covered protrusions that provide shade.

Totzeret HaAretz 2 and 3
Its construction was officially announced in December 2021, with a height of 75 floors.

See also

 List of tallest buildings in Tel Aviv
Israeli architecture

References

External links
 

Buildings and structures in Tel Aviv
Skyscraper office buildings in Israel